The timeline of Hungarian history lists the important historical events that took place in the territory of Hungary or are closely connected to the history of the country.

Before the Hungarians

Classical Antiquity

Before the Romans
5th century BC
The Syginnae live in the Great Hungarian Plain. Archaeological finds show their commercial contacts with the Adriatic Veneti and Greeks.
Early 4th century BC
Celts invade Pannonia and gradually conquer the lands along the Middle Danube.
3rd century BC
The Celticisation of Transdanubia is completed and the native languages disappear.
279 BC
Celts invade the Balkan Peninsula from the Middle Danube region, reaching as far as Greece.
113 BC
The Celtic Boii control the Middle Danube region when the Cimbri move across their territory during their migration towards the Alps.
 50 BC
The Osi, Cotini and Anarti live in the northern regions of the Great Hungarian Plain. The Dacians take control of the lands to the east of the river Tisza. 
 45 BC
The Dacian king, Burebista, defeats the Celtic ruler, Critasirus, and occupies lands east and north of the Middle Danube.
 44 BC
Burebista dies and his kingdom disintegrates.

Roman conquest

35 BC
The Romans force the Pannonian tribes living along the Sava into submission.
Late 1st century BC
Roman denarii start circulating in Transdanubia.
13 BC
The Roman generals Marcus Vipsanius Agrippa and Tiberius crush the Pannonian tribes' revolt between the Sava and the Dráva. The young Pannonians are captured and sold as slaves.
 12 BC
The Germanic tribe of Marcomanni force the Boii to abandon the lands north of the Middle Danube.
11 BC
The Romans include Pannonia in the Roman province of Illyricum, declaring the Danube as its northern border.
10 BC
The Roman general Marcus Vinicius launches an expedition across the Danube, forcing the Celtic tribes of the Great Hungarian Plain to make an alliance with the Roman Empire.
6 AD
Tiberius wages war against the Marcomanni. After the governor of Illyricum, Marcus Valerius Messalla Messallinus, orders the enlistment of the Pannonians in the Roman army, the Illyrian tribes rose up. Tiberius abandons his military campaign along the Elbe to fight against the rebels.
6–9
The Romans force the Illyrian tribes one by one into submission.

Roman Pannonia and its neighbors

8/9
Illyricum is divided into two along the Sava. The new Roman province incorporating the lands between the Sava and the Middle Danube is known as Pannonia.
10s
The Sarmatian tribe of the Iazyges settle in the plains between the Danube and the Tisza and force the Dacians to withdraw to Transylvania.
Emperor Tiberius settles veterans and civilians at Scarbantia (now Sopron) and Salla (now Zalalövő) on the Amber Road.
 18– 50 AD
Allied with Rome, Vannius, king of the Germanic Quadi, forces the tribes of the Great Hungarian Plain to pay tribute to him. 
40s–50s
Emperor Claudius establishes the colonia (or town) of Savaria (now Szombathely) on the Amber Road, settling veterans of the Legio XV Apollinaris in the town. Colonists from Aquilea and other north Italian towns move to Savaria and natives also live in the town.
Pliny the Elder lists the Boii, Azali, Eravisci, Cotini, Arabiates and Hercuniates among the native tribes living in Transdanubia in his Natural History. The native tribes are organized in civitates peregrinae (semi-autonomous districts supervised by a Roman military officer).
 50
Emperor Claudius forbids the governor of Pannonia, Sextus Palpellius Hister, to assist Vannius against his rebellious nephews, Sido and Italicus. Vannius is forced to abdicate and flee to Pannonia. His nephews divide his realm among themselves.
Natives are first recruited as auxiliaries in the Pannonian regions north of the Dráva.
Auxiliary forts are established at Arrabona, Brigetio and Aquincum (now Győr, Szőny and Budapest in Hungary).
68–69
The governor of Pannonia, Lucius Tampius Flavianus, intervenes in the struggle for the imperial throne in Rome. He dispatches Roman legionaries and the troops of Sido and Italicus to Rome to fight against Emperor Vitellius.
 73
The governor of Pannonia, Gaius Calpetanus Rantius, orders the strengthening of the auxiliary fort at Aquincum.
88
The Marcomanni and the Quadi refuse to support the Romans during Domitian's Dacian War. Emperor Domitian invade their territory, but he abandons the military campaign without defeating the Germanic peoples.
89
The Germanic tribes wage war against the Iazyges with Roman support.
92/93
The Iazyges invade Pannonia and route a Roman legion. Domitian comes to Pannonia and defeats the Iazyges.
98
Emperor Trajan appoints new kings to rule the Marcomanni and Quadi.
 100
A new fortress is built at Brigetio and the Legio XI Claudia is transferred to there. The Legio X Gemina is stationed at Aquincum.
Gorsium (now Tác) is made the center for the imperial cult in Pannonia.
 104
Pannonia is divided into two provinces, Pannonia Superior and Pannonia Inferior.
106
The newly established Legio XXX Ulpia Victrix replaces the Legio XI Claudia in Brigetio after the fall of Decebal's Dacian kingdom. The Iazyges take possession of the lowlands to the east of the Tisza. Roman watch towers are erected across the Middle Danube.
117
The Legio I Adiutrix replaces XXX Ulpia at Brigetio and Legio II Adiutrix takes over Aquincum from X Gemina.
117–119
The Iazyges make raids against Pannonia Inferior. Emperor Hadrian charges Marcius Turbo with the united command of Pannonia Inferior and Dacia to secure the coordination of military actions against the Iazyges and their allies, the Roxolani.
119
The Iazyges becomes Rome's foederati (or clients).
124
Hadrian make Aquincum a municipium. 
 135– 140
The Marcomanni and Quadi make raids against both Pannonian provinces.
136–138
Hadrian's designated heir, Lucius Aelius, is made the governor of both Pannonian provinces.
 140
Hadrian appoints a new king to rule the Quadi.
161
Emperor Marcus Aurelius transfers the Legio II Adiutrix to the empire's eastern border at the beginning of the Roman–Parthian War, replacing it with Legio IV Flavia Felix in Aquincum.
160s
Vexillationes (or detachments) of the Danubian legions are sent to fight against the Parthian Empire. Marcus Aurelius plans to annex the territory of the Marcomanni and Iazyges and establishes two new legions, Legio II Italica and Legio III Italica.
 166
Start of the Marcomannic Wars. The Germanic Lombards and Ubii attack Pannonia near Brigetio, but the Roman troops defeat them. Ballomar, the king of the Marcomanni, and envoys from 10 other tribes dwelling along the Roman border enter into negotiations with the governor of Pannonia Superior, Marcus Jallius Bassus.
167–171
The Marcomanni, Quadi and Iazyges make a series of raids against Pannonia and Dacia, capturing tens of thousands of Roman provincials and seizing much booty.
167–168
Marcus Aurelius and his co-emperor, Lucius Verus, are planning to launch a military expedition across the Danube, but Lucius dies unexpectedly and a plague forces Marcus Aurelius to return to Italy.
171
The Quadi's request for free access to the Roman markets is denied.
171–175
Marcus Aurelius writes parts of his Meditations while staying in Pannonia during his campaigns against the neighboring Germanic tribes.
172
Marcus Aurelius defeats the Quadi, forcing them to make a peace and release their Roman prisoners. He appoints Furtius to be their new king. Groups of Quadi are allowed to settle in the Danubian provinces.
173
Marcus Aurelius forces the Marcomanni to make peace and abandon the lands along the northern banks of the Danube. The Quadi dethrone Furtius and elect Ariogaesus their new ruler. 
Winter. Iazyges invade Pannonia across the Danube. Ariogaesus makes alliance with the Iazyges, but the Romans capture him.
174
Early. The Romans route the Iazyges. The Iazyges capture their king, Banadaspus, and elect Zanticus his successor.
 174
The remnants of the Cotini and the Germanic Naristae are settled in Pannonia.
175
The Iazyges agrees to release their Roman prisoners and to abandon the lands along the eastern banks of the Danube.
177–178
Germanic tribes and Iazyges make raids against Pannonia.
178
Summer. Marcus Aurelius and his co-emperor, Commodus, come to Pannonia to command the local troops in person.
Late. 40,000 Roman troops occupy the land of the Marcomanni and Quadi and winter there.
180
Spring. Marcus Aurelius prevents the Quadi from migrating to the north.
Autumn. Marcus Aurelius' successor, Commodus, makes peace with the Marcomanni and Quadi. He appoints Roman centurions to control the two tribes' activities before marching to Rome.
 185
Watchtowers are erected along the Middle Danube.
193
April 9. After Commodus' death, the governor of Pannonia Superior, Septimius Severus is proclaimed emperor by the Pannonian legions.
June. After seizing Rome, Septimius Severus musters primarily Pannonian troops to the Praetorian Guard.
194
Septimius Severus grants the rank of colonia to Aquincum.
196
Septimius Severus sends his son and heir, Caracalla, to Pannonia before his campaign against Clodius Albinus.
202
Septimius Severus personally inaugurates a new temple in Gorsium.
212
Caracalla grants Roman citizenship to all natives, but the conquered peoples (or dediticii) in the Roman Empire.
212/213
The Quadi invade Pannonia, but Emperor Caracalla had their king, Gaiobomarus, executed.
214
Caracalla makes the river Rába the new boundary between the two Pannonian provinces.
 230
Iazyges invade Pannonia.
248
Emperor Philip the Arab appoints Pacatianus the commander of the troops both in Pannonia Inferior and in Moesia Superior. The Illyricianithe troops of the Danubian provincesproclaim Pacatianus emperor, but they murder him when the Emperor appoints one of their number, Decius, their commander.
249
Summer. The Illyriciani proclaim Decius emperor.
250s
Quadi make raids against Pannonia.
258–260
The westward expansion of the Goths forces the Germanic Gepids and the Sarmatian Roxolani to move to the Carpathian Basin. Sarmatian and Germanic tribes make a series of raids against Pannonia. Emperor Gallienus settles groups of Marcomanni in Pannonia.
260s
Clashes between the Roxolani, Gepids, Iazyges and Vandals along the borders of Pannonia and Dacia.
Early 270s
Emperor Aurelian orders the evacuation of the province of Dacia.
 278
Iazyges invade Pannonia.
282
Emperor Carus defeats the Sarmatians and the Quadi.
285
The Sarmatians invade Pannonia, but Emperor Diocletian defeats them.
290
The Goths and the Taifali wage war against the Vandals and Gepids.
293
A Roman fort is built on the left bank of the Danube opposite Aquincum.
Diocletian defeats the Sarmatians.
294
A canal is built between the Lake Balaton and the Danube.
295
Carpians are settled around Sopianae.
Late 290s
Both Pannonian provinces are divided into two, with their parts north of the Dráva forming Pannonia Prima and Pannonia Valeria provinces. 
303
February 24. Diocletian forbids Christian worships in the Roman Empire.
June 8. Bishop Quirinus of Sescia (now Sisak in Croatia) is executed in Savaria.
305
Galerius and Constantine invade Sarmatian territory.
308
November. Pannonia is assigned to Emperor Licinius.
314
October 8. Battle of Cibalae: Constantine defeats Licinius, forcing him to abandon Pannonia.
320s-330s
New fortifications are built on plateaus along the Middle Danube.
322
May–June. A Sarmatian chieftain, Rausimodus, besieges Campona (in present-day Budapest), but Constantine forces him to abandon the siege.
332
The Goths invade Sarmatian territory, forcing the Argaragantes (the ruling Sarmatians) to arm their unfree subjects, the Limigantes. The Romans intervene in the war on the Sarmatians' behalf and defeat the Goths. The Limigantes rose up and defeat the Argaragantes who flee to Vandal and Roman territory.
332–334
After a series of clashes with the Romans, the Sarmatians accept Roman protectorate.
330s-350s
The Vandals, Gepids and Goths take possession of the northern regions of the Great Hungarian Plain.
356
The Quadi invade Pannonia Valeria and the Sarmatians attack Pannonia Secunda.
357
Summer. Emperor Constantius II comes to Sirmium to conduct negotiations with the Quadi and the Sarmatians.
Winter. The Quadi and the Sarmatians make a raid against the Pannonian provinces.
358
April. Constantius II invade the Limigantes' territory and Roman troops from Pannonia Valeria attack the Quadi, forcing their leaders to pay homage to the Emperor.
Winter. The Limigantes make raids against their neighbors.
359
April. Constantius II meets with the envoys of the Limigantes near Aquincum. The envoys try to capture him, but his retainers massacre them. The Romans invade Sarmatian territory, destroying their settlements.
365
The Quadi and the Sarmatians invade Roman territories.
 367
Emperor Valentinian I's magister militum, Aequitius, had new fortresses built along the Middle Danube.
374
Early. The Quadi protest against the erection of a Roman fortress on their territory, but Dux Maximianus kills their king Gabinius.
July. The Quadi invade Pannonia Valeria and slaughter or capture the local peasants.
375
August–November. Valentinian I invade Quadi territories.
November 17. Valentinian I dies in Brigetio during the peace negotiations with the Quadi envoys.

Late Antiquity
 375
Roman coins cease to circulate in Pannonia to the north of the Dráva.
378
Late summer-Autumn. Goths, Alans and Huns invade the Balkan provinces and Pannonia after their victory over the Romans in the Battle of Adrianople.
379–380
Tribesmen make plundering raids against Pannonia.
383
Pannonian grain is traded for wine in northern Italy.
395
The attacks of the Marcomanni, Hun and Goth armies devastate Pannonia.
401
The Vandals march through Pannonia to Italy.
402
The Visigoths led by Alaric arrives in Pannonia from Italy. 
405
The army of the Goth Radagaisus marches through Pannonia and attacks the Western Roman Empire.
408
The Visigoths return to Italy.
 420s
The Huns settle on the Hungarian Plain.
427
Pannonia Secunda and Pannonia Savia are ceded to the Huns.
433
The control of Pannonia Valeria is given up to the Huns.
The Roman administration withdraws from Pannonia Prima, the land is ceded to the Huns.
442
Sirmium is under the control of the Huns.
450s
Goths are settled in large numbers by Marcian in Pannonia.
After Attila's death, three Ostrogoth kingdoms come into existence. Western Pannonia is ruled by Theodemir, Vidimir controls the center region, the eastern parts of Pannonia belong to king Valamir. 
Theoderic the Great, the son of the Ostrogoth King Theodemir, was presumably born in Pannonia.
454
A coalition of Germanic tribes defeats the Huns in the Battle of Nedao. 
Sirmium is under Gepid control.
455-456
Successful campaigns by the Western Roman emperor Avitus in Pannonia, praised later by Sidonius Apollinaris. 
469
After Valamir's death, the Ostrogoths defeat the armies of the Germanic and Sarmatian tribes in the Battle of Bolia. 
474
The Ostrogoths led by Theoderic migrate from Pannonia to Lower Moesia. 
547
The Langobards settle in Pannonia, permitted by Justinian I.
565
At the end of the reign of Justinian I, the Gepid-controlled Pannonian settlement of Sirmium is still a significant city, subsequently occupied by Justin II.

Early Middle Ages

566/567
The Longobard king, Alboin, sends envoys to the Avar khagan, Baian, offering an alliance against the Gepids to him. Baian accepts the offer only after Gepidia is promised to him.
567
The Longobards and the Avars invade Gepidia. Cunimund, the last king of the Gepids, dies fighting against the Longobards. The Avars occupy Gepidia.
568
April. The Longobards and masses of Gepids, Sarmatians, Suebi and other peoples leave Pannonia for Italy. The Avars take possession of Pannonia.
582
The fall of Byzantine Sirmium to the Avars.
776
A Lombard lord, Aio, seeks refuge in Avar territory after a Lombard revolt against the Franks collapsed.
782
The Avar khagan and  send envoys to Charlemagne to Paderborn.
788
Frank and Bavarian troops defeat an Avar army near the river Ybbs.
791
Late August. Charlemagne's son, King Pepin of Italy, makes a raid against Avar territory.
Autumn. Charlemagne invades Avar territory, reaching as far as the river Rába, but an epidemic forces him to return to the Carolingian Empire.
795/796
795
Autumn. Duke Eric of Friuli's Slav military commander, Vojnomir, sacks the khagan's seat.
796
Early. The Avar tudun swears fealty to Charlemagne and converts to Christianity.
Summer. Pepin of Italy invades Avar territory, forcing the khagan to yield without resistance and chasing Avar leaders as far as the river Tisza. Paulinus II, Patriarch of Aquileia and other bishops in Pepin's army decide to start proselytizing among the Avars.
799
Archbishop Arno of Salzburg appoints Theoderic to proselytize among the Carantans and their neighbors to the north of the river Dráva. Gerold, Prefect of Bavaria who accompanies Theoderic is killed before a battle against rebellious Avars.
early 9th century
The Life of Saint Emmerama hagiography of Emmeram of Regensburgis rewritten to encourage clergymen to proselytize among the Avars.  
803
Charlemagne sends an army to Pannonia. The Avar tudun and his Slav and Avar retainers come to Regensburg to pay homage to Charlemagne.
 804
Krum, Khan of Bulgaria, invades Avar territory and defeats an Avar army.
805
February. Charlemagne cedes the territory between Sabaria (now Szombathely in Hungary) and Carnuntum (now Petronell-Carnuntum in Austria) to the Christian Avar kapkhan, Theodorus, and his people whom Slavs forced to leave their homeland.
September 21. Charlemagne restores the khagan's authority over the Avars. The khagan converts to Christianity at the Fischa.
811
Spring. Charlemagne sends an army to Pannonia to prevent further clashes between the Avars and the Slavs.
November. The envoys of the Avar khagan and tudun and of the chiefs of the Slavs living along the Danube appear in Charlemagne's court in Aachen.
822
Envoys of Slav tribes (among them the Moravians and the Praedenecenti) and of the Avars come to the court of Charlemagne's son, Louis the Pious, in Regensburg.
824
Khan Omurtag of Bulgaria sends an embassy to Louis the Pious, offering peace. Louis the Pious sends an envoy to Bulgaria.
825
May. Negotiations about the borders of the Carolingian Empire and Bulgaria in Aachen.
827
The Bulgars sail up the Dráva and destroy the lands on both sides of the river.
828
Louis the Pious's son, Louis the German, launches an unsuccessful military campaign against the Bulgars.
829
The Bulgars destroy villages along the Dráva.
830s
Burials with consistent east–west orientation spread in Pannonia.
833
Expelled across the Danube by Prince Mojmir I of Moravia, Pribina comes to Pannonia. He is baptised and joins the retinue of Radbod, the newly appointed prefect of the March of Pannonia.
 837
After a conflict with Radbod, Pribina flees first to Bulgaria, then to Ratimir, Duke of Lower Pannonia.
838
After Radbod defeats Ratimir, Pribina and Radbod are reconciled. Pribina receives a large estate in fief on the Zala River.
early 840s
Pribina gathers people on his domains and builds the fortress Mosaburg on the Zala (now Zalavár).
848
Early. The wandering Saxon priest, Gottschalk of Orbais, stays in Pannonia.
October 12. Louis the German reward Pribina with the complete ownership of his estates in Pannonia.
850
January 24. Liupramm, Archbishop of Salzburg consecrates a church dedicated to Mary the Virgin in Mosaburg.
860
May 8. Louis the German grants 20 peasant households near Savaria to the Benedictine Mattsee Abbey.
November 20. Louis the German grants Savaria and other settlements in Pannonia to Adalwin, Archbishop of Salzburg.
860s
Offerings of food and drink disappear in burials in Pannonia.
860/861
Pribina dies fighting against the Moravians. His son, Kocel, inherits his estates.
866–867
The Byzantine missionaries, Constantine and Methodius, stay in Mosaburg during their journey from Moravia to Rome. Kocel learns the Glagolitic script and entrust 50 pupils to them.
869
Pope Hadrian II sanctions the use of Old Church Slavonic in liturgy. Methodius returns to Mosaburg as papal legate, but Kocel sends him back to Rome, requesting the Pope to appoint Methodius bishop of Pannonia. The Pope makes Methodius archbishop of Sirmium with jurisdiction in Pannonia and Moravia.
870
Early. Bishop Ermanrich of Passau captures Methodius.
873
Spring. Pope John VIII achieves the release of Methodius.
 876
Kocel dies.

Hungarian (or Magyar) "pre-history"

early 9th century
The Khazar Khagan appoints Levedi to be the supreme head of the confederation of the Magyar tribes, allegedly granting the Khazar title kündür to him.
 830 (?)
After being defeated by the Pechenegs, the Magyars settle in Etelköz (in the Pontic steppes) and get rid of Khazar suzerainty. The Kabarsa group of peoples who rose up against the Khaganjoin them.
837
The Bulgarians hire Magyar warriors to prevent a group of Byzantine prisoners from returning to their homeland across the Lower Danube, but the Byzantines defeat the Magyars. 
 861
Methodius comes across Magyar raiders in the Crimea.
862
The Magyars' first raid against East Francia (or Germany).
 870
The Magyars dominate the steppes between the Lower Danube and the river "Atil" (most probably the Don River). Their tribal confederation is headed by a paramount chief, the kende, and a military leader, the gyula.
881
The Magyars and the Kabars make a plundering raid against the Duchy of Bavaria.
 892
According to scholarly theories, the first Magyar groups settle in the Carpathian Basin (in the lowlands east of the river Tisza).
892
Magyar horsemen support Arnulf, King of East Francia against King Svatopluk I of Moravia.
 894
Magyar raiders destroy Pannonia in alliance with Svatopluk I. After the Magyar leaders, Árpád and Kurszán conclude an alliance with the Byzantines against King Simeon I of Bulgaria, Magyar troops invade Bulgaria.

Medieval Hungary

Conquest and raids

Hungarian chronicles written centuries after the events contain contradictory stories about the Conquest. Among them, the Gesta Hungarorum provides the most detailed narration, but its reliability is debated. The timeline only presents events verified by contemporaneous sources.

 895
Bulgarians and Pechenegs invade Etelköz while the bulk of the Magyar army is away on a military campaign. The Magyars leave Etelköz and cross the Carpathian Mountains to settle in the lowlands east of the Middle Danube.
896
Arnulf appoints Braslav, Duke of Lower Pannonia to rule Mosaburg and the March of Pannonia.   
899
Summer. Arnulf persuades the Magyars (or Hungarians) to invade the Po Valley (in Italy).
September 24. Battle of Brenta: the Hungarians route Arnulf's opponent, King Berengar I of Italy.
900
The Hungarians occupy Pannonia (to the west of the Middle Danube).
November 20. Battle of Linz: Luitpold, Margrave of Bavaria and Richar, Bishop of Passau defeat the Hungarians who has invaded Bavaria. 
902
The Hungarians invade Moravia.
902–907
The Hungarians destroy Moravia.
904
The Bavarians murder Kurszán at a banquet.
907
July 4–5. Battle of Brezalauspurc: the Hungarians annihilate a large Bavarian army and take control of the lands as far as the Enns.
926
Henry I, King of East Francia, agrees to pay an annual tribute to the Hungarians to prevent their raids.
932
Henry I denies to pay further tributes.
933
March 15. Battle of Riade: Henry I defeats the Hungarians who has invaded the Duchy of Saxony.
934
The Hungarians and Pechenegs make a joint plundering raid against the Byzantine Empire. The Byzantines agrees to pay a yearly tribute.
 948
A high-ranking Magyar chieftain, the horka Bulcsú, is baptised in Constantinople, but he continues to make raids against the Byzantine Empire.
 949
The second-ranking Magyar chieftain, Gylas, is baptised in Constantinople. The Ecumenical Patriarch consecrates a Greek monk, Hierotheos, bishop of Tourkia (or Hungary) and Hierotheos accompanies Gylas back to Hungary.
 950
Árpád's grandson, Fajsz, is the paramount leader of the confederation of the seven Magyar tribes and the Kabars.
 955
Jews living in Hungary forward Hasdai ibn Shaprut's letter to the Khazars.
955
August 10. Battle of Lechfeld: Otto I, King of Germany, annihilates the Hungarian raiders near Augsburg.
960s–990s
The Bavarians gradually seize the territory between the Enns and Leitha rivers.
970
March. Battle of Arcadiopolis: the Byzantines defeat the united Rus', Bulgarian and Hungarian armies.
early 970s
German and Italian missionaries came to Hungary. Géza, Grand Prince of the HungariansÁrpád's great-grandsonis baptised, but he does not fully abandon the veneration of pagan deities.
973
Easter. Hungarian delegates are present at Otto I's court in Quedlinburg. 
 997
Géza's son, Stephen, marries Gisela, a relative of Otto III, Holy Roman Emperor who is accompanied by German knights to Hungary.
997
Géza dies and his kinsman, Koppány, contests Stephen's right to succeed his father. German knights assist Stephen to defeat Koppány.
 1000
The establishment of the earliest Benedictine abbey, Pannonhalma and of the first Roman Catholic dioceses (Veszprém, Esztergom and Győr).

High Middle Ages

1000
December 25. Stephen is crowned the first king of Hungary in Esztergom.
1000s
Stephen I issues his earliest decrees, ordering the building of churches and prohibiting pagan practices.
1002–1009
The first countiesterritorial units of royal administrationare mentioned in royal charters. Each county was headed by an appointed royal official, styled ispán (or count).
 1003
Ajtony a chieftain ruling Banat is baptised in Vidin. He establishes a Greek monastery in his seat at Morisena (now Cenad in Romania).
1003
Stephen I invades Transylvania, forcing his maternal uncle, Gyula, into submission.
1018
Stephen I opens Hungary to pilgrims coming from Western Europe to Jerusalem.
 1020
Bishop Fulbert of Chartres sends a copy of Priscian's Grammar to Bonipert, Bishop of Pécs, implying the existence of a cathedral school at Pécs.
1020s
A king's mirror entitled Admonitions is completed in Hungary.
 1028
Stephen I's military commander, Csanád, defeats Ajtony. Ajtony's realm is transformed into a county. The Greek monks are transferred from Morisena to a nearby monastery and a Roman Catholic diocese is set up in Ajtony's former seat (which is renamed for Csanád).
1030
Conrad II, Holy Roman Emperor, invades Hungary, but the Hungarians repel his attack.
1031
Stephen I's son and heir, Emeric, dies unexpectedly.
1030s
Stephen I appoints his sister's son, the Venetian Peter Orseolo, to be his heir. Stephen I's cousin, Vazul, is executed and Vazul's sonsAndrew, Béla and Leventeare forced into exile.

Notes

References

Sources

T
Hungarian